Bryna Taubman is an American journalist and author.

She graduated from Miami University Ohio and the Columbia University Graduate School of Journalism.   She worked at the New York Post.  Her first book was How to Become an Assertive Woman in 1976.

Bibliography
 How to Become an Assertive Woman - the key to self-fulfillment, Simon & Schuster, 1976 
 Lady Cop: True Stories of Police Women in America's Toughest City, Warner Books, 1988 
 The Preppy Murder Trial, St Martins Mass Market Paper; Reissue edition, 1988 
 Hell Hath No Fury: A True Story of Wealth and Passion, Love and Envy, and a Woman Driven to the Ultimate Revenge, Mass Market Paperback Publisher: St. Martin's True Crime Date, 1992

External links
 Ramon Jaime Machado Marries Bryna Taubman

American non-fiction writers
Miami University alumni
Living people
Columbia University Graduate School of Journalism alumni
Year of birth missing (living people)